Tyler Dickinson (born 18 August 1996) is an English professional rugby league footballer who plays as a  for the Sheffield Eagles in the Betfred Championship.

Background
Dickinson was born in Halifax, West Yorkshire, England.

Club career

Huddersfield Giants
He spent the majority of his Huddersfield Giants career out on loan to Halifax and Oldham (Heritage № 1358) in the Championship, and the Keighley Cougars, Newcastle Thunder and Workington Town in League 1.

Sheffield Eagles
On 10 Aug 2020 it was announced that he had signed for the Sheffield Eagles. Following the end of the 2021 season Dickinson signed a new 2-year contract with the Eagles.

References

External links
Huddersfield Giants profile
SL profile

1996 births
Living people
Batley Bulldogs players
English rugby league players
Halifax R.L.F.C. players
Huddersfield Giants players
Keighley Cougars players
Oldham R.L.F.C. players
Newcastle Thunder players
Rugby league players from Halifax, West Yorkshire
Rugby league props
Sheffield Eagles players
Workington Town players